The Next List is a 30-minute weekend television program on CNN.  It aired every Saturday afternoon at 2:30 pm ET/PT and was hosted by Dr. Sanjay Gupta.

CNN announced cancellation in September 2013.

Each week, the show profiled innovators, visionaries, and agents of change from around the world who are steadily mapping the course to the future with their new ideas. Each half-hour episode featured one 'Next Lister' and told their story about what they're doing to change the world, what challenges they faced, and the innovative approaches they've developed to overcome obstacles.  Next Listers are creative, passionate, and embracers of opportunity and change.

The show premiered on November 13, 2011 and featured cyber-illusionist Marco Tempest.

Format

The show was shot exclusively on DSLR using the Canon 5D Mark II camera giving it its signature cinematic look. In every episode each Next Lister is asked to 'sign' their name to the 'list' by writing their name backwards on a window of glass or Plexiglas. The sign-in is taped for use in the show and pays homage to Leonardo da Vinci who was known for his mirror writing and was a great historical innovator.

The Next List blog featured online commentary from those profiled on the show, as well as the latest on innovation and creative thinkers from around the world.

Episodes

References

External links
 

CNN original programming